Salla (Kuolajärvi until 1936) is a municipality of Finland, located in Lapland. The municipality has a population of 
which 
is water. The population density is
.

The nearby settlement of Sallatunturi is home to the Salla Ski Resort.

History

Salla is in the Eastern Lapland and as a border area was affected by the Second World War. Red Army troops invaded Finland at Salla during the Winter War but were stopped by the Finnish Army (see Battle of Salla). Parts of the municipality were ceded to the Soviet Union after the war.  The ceded part is sometimes called "Old Salla" or Vanha Salla. During the Continuation War the old town of Salla was on the Soviet side of the border. The German XXXVI Corps attacked the Soviet positions in an operation code-named Polarfuchs. With the help of the Finnish 6th Division it managed to occupy all of the ceded territories. At the end of the war the German troops were pushed out of Lapland by Finnish troops in the Lapland War.

The following villages were ceded to the Soviet Union: Alakurtti, Korja (Korya), Kuolajärvi (Kuoloyarvi), Lampela, Sallansuu, Yläkurtti (Yulyakurtti), Sovajärvi (Sovayarvi), Tuutijärvi (Tuutiyarvi) and Vuorijärvi (Vuoriyarvi).

In January 2021, the mayor of Salla, Erkki Parkkinen, launched a bid to host the 2032 Summer Olympic Games to raise awareness of climate change and highlight the threat the climate crisis poses to Salla and its ecosystem, which is dependent on low temperatures for most of the year.

Transportation

Salla is the terminus of a freight-only railway line from Kemijärvi. In 2006, the Finnish Rail Administration announced proposals to close the line. The railway formerly extended beyond Salla into Russia, but has never carried international traffic.

Geography 
Neighbour municipalities are Kemijärvi, Kuusamo, Pelkosenniemi, Posio and Savukoski.

Climate
Salla has a subarctic climate (Dfc). Summer days are mild with about 1/3 of all days experiencing precipitation with nights tending to be cool. Winters are very long, cold, snowy, and extremely cloudy, lasting from the beginning of October through April, with mid-winter thaws being rare, and cold snaps relatively common. Spring and Autumn tend to be cool, not very variable, and short, lasting only a couple weeks to a few weeks in length.

The low temperature record of Salla is -50 °C (-58 °F), which was recorded in Naruska in 1985. It was also the record of Finland until 1999. On 28 January 1999, the unofficial record of Finland, -54,3 °C (-65,7 °F), was recorded in Naruska.

Historical places

In popular culture 

Salla was referenced in the song 66°50’N, 28°40’E by Finnish death-doom band Swallow the Sun on their 2015 triple album Songs From the North I, II and III.

References

External links 

 Municipality of Salla – Official website

 
Populated places established in 1857
Finland–Russia border crossings
1857 establishments in the Russian Empire